"Spilled Perfume" is a song co-written and recorded by American country music artist Pam Tillis.  It was released in March 1994 as the lead single from her album Sweetheart's Dance.  The song was written by Tillis and Dean Dillon.

Content
The lyrics are a first-person account of a friend comforting a woman who is regretful after a one-night stand.

Music video
A music video directed by Steven Goldmann was made for the song, and premiered in mid-1994.

Personnel
Compiled from liner notes.
 Mike Brignardello – bass guitar
 Paul Franklin — steel guitar
 Rob Hajacos – fiddle
 Mary Ann Kennedy — background vocals
 Brent Mason — electric guitar
 Terry McMillan — percussion
 Steve Nathan – piano
 Bobby Ogdin – synthesizer
 Pam Tillis – lead vocals, background vocals
 Biff Watson – acoustic guitar
 Lonnie Wilson – drums

Chart performance
For the chart week of June 18, 1994, "Spilled Perfume" reached the top 5 of Billboards Hot Country Songs chart, her fifth single to do so at the time.

Charts

Year-end charts

References

1994 singles
1994 songs
Pam Tillis songs
Songs written by Dean Dillon
Music videos directed by Steven Goldmann
Arista Nashville singles
Songs written by Pam Tillis
Songs about infidelity